Monomorium consternens, is a species of ant of the subfamily Myrmicinae.

References

External links

 at antwiki.org
Animaldiversity.org

consternens
Hymenoptera of Asia